D 88 (also known as Sheikh Khalifa Bin Zayed Road from the Bur Dubai side and Omar Bin Al Khattab Road from the Deira side) is a road in Dubai, United Arab Emirates.

See also
 Dubai route numbering system

References

Roads in the United Arab Emirates
Transport in Dubai